Paul Geremia (born April 21, 1944) is an American blues singer and acoustic guitarist.

Geremia was born in Providence, Rhode Island, United States. He recorded his first album in 1968, having been significantly influenced by both the rural blues tradition and the folk music revival of the 1960s. Geremia has never recorded with electric guitar, hewing steadfastly to a traditional ethic with his acoustic playing.

Discography
Just Enough (Folkways Records, 1968)
Paul Geremia (Sire Records, 1968)
I Really Don't Mind Livin' (Flying Fish Records, 1982)
My Kinda Place (Flying Fish, 1986)
Gamblin' Woman Blues (Red House Records, 1993)
Self Portrait in Blues (Vanguard Records, 1995)
Live From Uncle Sam's Backyard (Red House, 1997)
Devil's Music (Red House, 1999)
Hard Life Rockin' Chair (Genes Records, 2000)
Love, Murder and Mosquitos (Red House, 2004)
Love My Stuff (Red House, 2011)

Achievements
Geremia's rendition of Fred McDowell's "Get Right Church" was the opening track on Preachin’ the Blues: The Music of Mississippi Fred McDowell (Telarc), which earned a Grammy nomination in 2002.
Two of his Red House releases, Gamblin’ Woman Blues and Self Portrait in Blues, were both nominated for W.C. Handy Awards.
Inducted into the Rhode Island Music Hall of Fame, 2013.

References

1944 births
Living people
American blues singers
American blues guitarists
American male guitarists
Singers from Rhode Island
Guitarists from Rhode Island
20th-century American guitarists
20th-century American male musicians
Red House Records artists
Flying Fish Records artists